Dean Paul Martin (born 19 February 1957) is an English former footballer.

Career
Martin played for Stoke City before joining local rivals Port Vale on trial in July 1976. He appeared as a substitute in a 1–0 defeat at Wrexham in a first round League Cup match on 18 August 1976. He was not selected again and was instead released in September 1976. He later worked as a matchday ambassador at Vale Park, now has been a match day host for sponsors for many years.

Career statistics
Source:

References

1957 births
Living people
Footballers from Stoke-on-Trent
English footballers
Association football forwards
Stoke City F.C. players
Port Vale F.C. players